The Catholic Irish Brigade was a unit in the British Army during the French Revolutionary Wars, largely drafted from the formerly-hostile French Irish Brigade by a series of rare changes in British and French policy.

Context
The success of the Irish Brigade in France from 1690 to 1791 came to an unexpected end during the French Revolution, as it had always sworn loyalty only to King Louis XVI, and the former kings, as distinct from the French people. Louis was re-titled as "King of the French" and was then deposed on 10 August 1792 and within months he had been tried and sentenced to death.

The Irish Brigade regiments lost their distinctive uniforms and were renamed and renumbered in 1791, and some of their officers were also executed, such as Théobald Dillon in 1792 and Arthur Dillon. As royalists and Roman Catholics, they were hostile to the dechristianization of France during the French Revolution and the whole concept of the French First Republic.

Establishment
When the War of the First Coalition included Britain from February 1793, it was not so surprising that many in the Brigade came to think of supporting their ancient enemy. The British Prime Minister William Pitt the Younger had recently tried to end Catholic grievances by promoting the Roman Catholic Relief Act 1793 enacted by the Irish Parliament. He supported the creation of St Patrick's College, Maynooth in 1795, allowing Catholic priests to be trained in Ireland. These were considerable reforms of the formerly harsh penal laws.

Pitt invited several Irish Brigade officers to London in 1794 and offered to set up a "Catholic Irish Brigade", envisaged as 6 regiments that would be raised in Ireland and led by men such as Count Daniel Charles O'Connell (an uncle of Daniel O'Connell). This was agreed and formalised. However, recruitment was hampered by hostility and fear from the Protestant Ascendancy at the idea of raising such a brigade, competition from the Irish Militia, whose members would serve at home (see Militia (Ireland) Act 1802), and also some ridicule from the new and pro-French republican United Irishmen.

Other officers, such as Henry Dillon, had no previous affiliation with France, but were cousins of, or descended from, officers of the formerly-French Irish Brigade.

Saint-Domingue / Haiti
In 1792 some regiments from the Irish Brigade were posted to Saint-Domingue (now Haiti), a French slave colony in the Caribbean, to put down a slave rebellion that had started in 1791. Assisted by local Irish-origin slave-owners they lost a skirmish at Les Plantons, and started local massacres to cow the population. Léger-Félicité Sonthonax arrived from France in 1792 as Commissioner, and soon realised that freeing the slaves would be a better policy. This emancipation was effected by him in 1793, after the outbreak of war with Britain. The Irish Brigade units in Haiti then changed sides and assisted in the British invasion of Haiti in 1794-98 under General Thomas Maitland, and were paid for by Pitt. Some former Irish Brigade officers led new regiments raised in Jamaica that were mostly composed of African-origin soldiers. After several years of unsuccessful warfare, during which most casualties were caused by tropical diseases, Maitland signed a treaty in 1798 with Toussaint Louverture promising to leave, and in return Louverture promised not to foment a slave revolt in Jamaica.

As well as Haiti, other units of the Catholic Irish Brigade were established in 1795 and posted to safer but more tedious and unglamorous garrison duties in places such as Nova Scotia.

Summary
While the Brigade only lasted for 4 years, with a maximum strength of 4,500 men, it demonstrated Pitt's understanding that many Irish Catholics would support his war against the French republican state. Losses from disease, difficulties in recruitment, competition from other formations and the outbreak of the Irish Rebellion of 1798 all ended Pitt's experiment.

It can be contrasted with the Napoleonic Irish Legion that served France from 1803 to 1815.

Bibliography

References

Defunct Irish regiments of the British Army
William Pitt the Younger
Military units and formations established in 1794
1794 establishments in Ireland
1794 establishments in Great Britain
Military units and formations disestablished in 1798
1798 disestablishments in Ireland
1798 disestablishments in Great Britain
British defence policymaking